The Lewis chessmen or Uig chessmen, named after the island or the bay where they were found, are a group of distinctive 12th-century chess pieces, along with other game pieces, most of which are carved from walrus ivory. Discovered in 1831 on Lewis in the Outer Hebrides of Scotland, they may constitute some of the few complete, surviving medieval chess sets, although it is not clear if a set as originally made can be assembled from the pieces. When found, the hoard contained 93 artifacts: 78 chess pieces, 14 tablemen and one belt buckle. Today, 82 pieces are owned and usually exhibited by the British Museum in London, and the remaining 11 are at the National Museum of Scotland in Edinburgh.

Additionally, a newly identified piece, a "warder", the equivalent of a castle or rook, was sold for £735,000 in July 2019.  Four other major pieces, and many pawns,  remain missing from the chess sets.

Origin 
Most accounts have said the pieces were found at Uig Bay on the west coast of Lewis, but Caldwell et al. of National Museums Scotland (NMS) consider that Mealista—which is also in the parish of Uig and some  further south down the coast—is a more likely place for the hoard to have been discovered. The hoard was divided and sold in the 19th century; the British Museum (BM) holds 82 pieces, and National Museums Scotland has the other 11 pieces.

At the British Museum, Sir Frederic Madden, Assistant Keeper of Manuscripts, persuaded the trustees to purchase for 80 guineas (£84) the 82 pieces which he had been misled into believing was the entire hoard. Madden was a palaeographer, a scholar of early vernacular literature, but he was especially intrigued by these artifacts because he was a chess enthusiast. Madden immediately set about writing a monumental research paper about the collection, titled "Historical remarks on the introduction of the game of chess into Europe and on the ancient chessmen discovered in the Isle of Lewis", published in Archaeologia XXIV (1832), one that remains informative and impressive today.

There are many medieval chess bishops of various origins in different museums in Europe and US. A bishop that probably predates the Lewis chessmen was in the collection of Jean-Joseph Marquet de Vasselot and was sold at Christie's in Paris in 2011 with a radiocarbon dating report stating that there is a 95% probability that the ivory dates between 790 and 990 AD. It is thought to be English or German and carved in the 12th century. Stylistically it predates the Lewis chessmen, as its mitre is worn sideways.

Description 

Almost all of the pieces in the collection are carved from walrus ivory, with a few made instead from whale teeth. The 79 chess pieces consist of eight kings, eight queens, 16 bishops, 15 knights, 13 rooks (after the 2019 discovery) and 19 pawns.  The heights of the pawns range from 3.5 to 5.8 cm, while the other pieces are between 7 and 10.2 cm. Although there are 19 pawns (a complete set requires 16), they have the greatest range of sizes of all the pieces, which has suggested that the 79 chess pieces might belong to at least five sets. All the pieces are sculptures of human figures, with the exception of the pawns, which are smaller, geometric shapes.  The knights are mounted on rather diminutive horses and are shown holding spears and shields.  The rooks are standing soldiers or "warders" holding shields and swords; four of the rooks are shown as wild-eyed berserkers biting their shields with battle fury. Some pieces bore traces of red stain when found, possibly indicating that red and white were used to distinguish the two sides, rather than the black and white generally used in modern chess.

Scholars have observed that to the modern eye the figural pieces, with their bulging eyes and glum expressions, have a distinctly comic character. This is especially true of one rook ("warder 4" in Madden's numbering) with a worried, sideways glance and the berserker rooks biting their shields, which have been called "irresistibly comic to a modern audience." It is believed, however, that the comic or sad expressions were not intended or perceived as such by the makers, who instead saw strength, ferocity or, in the case of the queens who hold their heads with a hand and seemingly pensive expression, "contemplation, repose and possibly wisdom."

Discovery 
The chessmen were discovered in early 1831 in a sand bank at the head of Camas Uig on the west coast of the Isle of Lewis, in the Outer Hebrides of Scotland.  There are various local stories concerning their arrival and modern discovery on Lewis.

Malcolm "Sprot" MacLeod from the nearby township of Pennydonald discovered the trove in a small stone kist in a dune, exhibited them briefly in his byre and sold them on to Captain Roderick Ryrie.  One reported detail, that a cow actually unearthed the stash, is generally discounted in Uig as fabrication. After the Isle of Lewis was purchased by Sir James Matheson in 1844, Malcolm Macleod and his family were evicted during the Highland Clearances which transformed the area into sheep farms.

When the chessmen were uncovered in 1831, one knight and four warders were missing from the four sets. In June 2019 a warder piece, which had previously gone unrecognised for at least 55 years, emerged in Edinburgh, and was purchased at a Sotheby's auction for £735,000 the following month, by an undisclosed buyer.

Exhibition and ownership 

They were exhibited by Ryrie at a meeting of the Society of Antiquaries of Scotland, on 11 April 1831. The chessmen were soon after split up, with 10 being purchased by Charles Kirkpatrick Sharpe and the others (67 chessmen and 14 tablemen) purchased on behalf of the British Museum in London.

Kirkpatrick Sharpe later found another bishop to take his collection up to 11, all of which were later sold to Albert Denison, 1st Baron Londesborough. In 1888, they were again sold, but this time the purchaser was the Society of Antiquaries of Scotland, who donated the pieces to the Royal Scottish Museum in Edinburgh.  The 11 are now on display in the National Museum of Scotland.

Of the pieces given to the British Museum, most can be found in Room 40, with the registration numbers M&ME 1831, 11–1.78–159.  Others have been lent to Scottish museums and temporary exhibitions. A range of wooden or plastic replicas are popular items in the Museum shops.

The chessmen were number 5 in the list of British archaeological finds selected by experts at the British Museum for the 2003 BBC Television documentary Our Top Ten Treasures, presented by Adam Hart-Davis.  They were featured in the 2010 BBC Radio 4 series A History of the World in 100 Objects as number 61, in the "Status Symbols" section.

An exhibition entitled "The Lewis Chessmen: Unmasked" included chess pieces from both the National Museum of Scotland and British Museum collections, along with other relevant objects, touring Scotland in 2010–2011. The exhibition opened in Edinburgh on 21 May 2010 and proceeded to Aberdeen, Shetland, and the Museum nan Eilean in Stornoway, opening there on 15 April 2011.

An exhibition entitled "The Game of Kings: Medieval Ivory Chessmen from the Isle of Lewis" at The Cloisters in New York City included 34 of the chess pieces, all on loan from the British Museum. The exhibit ended on 22 April 2012.

On 3 April 2013, £1.8 million from the European Regional Development Fund was granted to transform Lews Castle, on the Isle of Lewis, into a Museum for the Western Isles. Around £14 million in total is to be spent on restoring and converting the property, which has been shut for almost 25 years.  When completed the permanent displays will include six of the Lewis Chessmen.

In 2023, the Edinburgh warder piece was displayed in a special exhibit at the Neue Galerie New York, as part of a special exhibit on the private collection of gallery founder and investor Ronald Lauder.

Dispute over location 

In 2007–2008 a dispute arose as to where the main resting place of the pieces should be. This arose in late in 2007 with calls from Scottish National Party (SNP) politicians in the Western Isles (notably Councillor Annie Macdonald, MSP Alasdair Allan and MP Angus MacNeil) for the return of the pieces to the place they were found. Linda Fabiani, Scottish Minister for Europe, External Affairs and Culture, stated that "it is unacceptable that only 11 Lewis Chessmen rest at the National Museum of Scotland while the other 67 (as well as the 14 tablemen) remain in the British Museum in London."

Richard Oram, Professor of Medieval and Environmental History at the University of Stirling, agreed, arguing that there was no reason for there to be more than "a sample" of the collection in London.  These views were dismissed by Margaret Hodge, the then UK Minister of State in the Department for Culture, Media and Sport, writing "It's a lot of nonsense, isn't it?", noting the law protects purchases and drawing comparisons to major artworks in Europe housed in major cities, with replicas available often where tourism is sufficient, in situ.  The historical society in Uig, Comann Eachdraidh Ùig, which operates its museum near the find site features detailed information about the chessmen and Norse occupation in Lewis. It has published that it cannot claim to own the pieces and would allow the normal museums' market to determine if more originals rest in Edinburgh. It welcomes short-term loans.

In October 2009, 24 of the pieces from London and six from Edinburgh began a 16-month tour of Scotland partly funded by the Scottish Government, whose Mike Russell, Minister for Culture and External Affairs, stated that the Government and the British Museum had "agreed to disagree" on their eventual fate. Bonnie Greer, the museum's deputy chairman, said that she "absolutely" believed the main collection should remain in London.

Neil MacGregor, who at the time of the debate was director of the British Museum, was reported to say "that it was Norway who was entitled to ask for them 'back, not Scotland. Madeline Bunting writes that "the British Museum has picked its way carefully and six of the figures were loaned long-term to Lewis's new museum in 2015".

See also 
Charlemagne chessmen

References

Sources 

 
 
 Murray, H. J. R. (1985). A History of Chess. Oxford University Press.

 Stratford, N. (1997). The Lewis chessmen and the enigma of the hoard. The British Museum Press.
 Taylor, Michael (1978).  The Lewis Chessmen. British Museum Publications Limited.

External links 
 
 The British Museum's page on the chessmen.
National Museums Scotland's pages on the chessmen
 A History of the World in 100 Objects, Number 61: The Lewis Chessmen
 A Website dedicated to the Lewis chessmen, their form and history
 Sketchfab: 3D models of the chess pieces at National Museum of Scotland

Archaeological artifacts
Archaeology of Scotland
Chess in Norway
Chess in Scotland
Chess sets
Collections of the National Museums of Scotland
History of chess
History of the Outer Hebrides
Ivory works of art
Isle of Lewis
Medieval European objects in the British Museum
Scandinavian Scotland
Romanesque art
Treasure troves in Scotland
Medieval chess
12th century in Scotland
1831 archaeological discoveries